Przemysław Sajdak (born 7 February 2000) is a Polish professional footballer who plays as a midfielder for Skra Częstochowa.

References

Living people
People from Krosno
2000 births
Association football midfielders
Polish footballers
Puszcza Niepołomice players
ŁKS Łódź players
Skra Częstochowa players
Ekstraklasa players
I liga players
II liga players
III liga players